Sara Jemai (born 12 April 2002) is an Italian female javelin thrower, born in Italy from Tunisian father.

Biography
She has now devoted herself exclusively to the javelin throw, as a youngster she also competed in the heptathlon, to the point of being able to win an Italian under 23 title in 2013.

Personal bests
Javelin throw: 58.19 m -  Pescara, 9 September 2018

Achievements

National titles
Jemai won nine times the national championship.
 Italian Athletics Championships
 Javelin throw: 2013, 2014, 2015, 2018 (4)
 Italian Winter Throwing Championships
 Javelin throw: 2014, 2016, 2018, 2019, 2021 (5)

See also
 Italian all-time lists - Javelin throw

References

External links
 

1992 births
Living people
Italian female javelin throwers
Athletics competitors of Gruppo Sportivo Esercito
Italian heptathletes
Competitors at the 2015 Summer Universiade
European Games competitors for Italy
Athletes (track and field) at the 2019 European Games